Ange-Freddy Plumain (born 2 March 1995) is a Guadeloupean professional footballer who plays as a winger for Bnei Sakhnin. He is a former France youth international having represented his nation at under-16 level before representing Guadeloupe at senior level.

Club career

Lens
On 5 October 2012, Plumain made his professional debut appearing as a substitute in a 1–0 victory over Niort.

Fulham
On 25 July 2013, Plumain signed a three-year contract with English side Fulham, with an option to extend for another year. He initially played for the club's Development team in the Professional Development League.

Plumain made his Fulham first-team debut in the FA Cup third round against Norwich City at Carrow Road, coming as a substitute for Alexander Kačaniklić for the second half of the game.

However, he was released at the end of his three-year contract in June 2016.

Red Star
Plumain joined Paris-based Ligue 2 side Red Star on a season-long loan, Fulham announced on 31 August 2015.

Sedan
After being released by Fulham in June 2016 Plumain joined Sedan.

International career
Plumain was born in France and is Guadeloupean descent. He is a youth international for France.

Career statistics

Club

References

External links
 
 
 
 
 

1995 births
Living people
Footballers from Paris
French footballers
Guadeloupean footballers
Association football midfielders
France youth international footballers
French people of Guadeloupean descent
Ligue 2 players
Championnat National players
Israeli Premier League players
TFF First League players
Challenger Pro League players
RC Lens players
Fulham F.C. players
Red Star F.C. players
CS Sedan Ardennes players
US Quevilly-Rouen Métropole players
Hapoel Hadera F.C. players
Beitar Jerusalem F.C. players
Samsunspor footballers
K.V.C. Westerlo players
FC Rukh Lviv players
Hapoel Tel Aviv F.C. players
Sektzia Ness Ziona F.C. players
Bnei Sakhnin F.C. players
French expatriate footballers
Guadeloupean expatriate footballers
Expatriate footballers in England
Expatriate footballers in Israel
Expatriate footballers in Turkey
Expatriate footballers in Belgium
Expatriate footballers in Ukraine
French expatriate sportspeople in England
French expatriate sportspeople in Israel
French expatriate sportspeople in Turkey
French expatriate sportspeople in Belgium
French expatriate sportspeople in Ukraine
Guadeloupean expatriate sportspeople in England
Guadeloupean expatriate sportspeople in Israel
Guadeloupean expatriate sportspeople in Turkey
Guadeloupean expatriate sportspeople in Belgium
Guadeloupean expatriate sportspeople in Ukraine